BPY may refer to:
 2,2'-Bipyridine
 The ISO/FDIS 639-3 code for Bishnupriya Manipuri language
 Beta-amyrin synthase, an enzyme